The Third Order of Saint Dominic (abbreviated TOP), also referred to as the Lay Fraternities of Saint Dominic or Lay Dominicans since 1972, is a Roman Catholic third order affiliated with the Dominican Order.

Lay Dominicans are men and women, singles and couples living a Christian life with a Dominican spirituality in the secular world. They find inspiration following the same spiritual path taken by many saints, blesseds, and other holy men and women throughout the 800-year history of the Dominican Order. The Life of a Dominican layperson is all about having a passion for the Word of God. It is about committing one self to a community of like minded brothers and sisters that immerse themselves in the word of God. There are Lay Dominican provinces all around the world.

Background

Dominic de Guzmán established the Ordo Praedicatorum in 1215. There are four principal branches:
 Friars - Formerly designated the "First Order", these are the brothers and priests who take solemn vows of poverty, chastity and obedience. Friars may be involved in various ministries.
 Nuns - The "Second Order" actually pre-dates the friars, as the Dominican nuns trace their founding to a monastery for women Dominic established at Prouille around 1206. Like the friars, the nuns also take solemn vows, but lead an enclosed, contemplative life of prayer.
 Third Order: Dominic did not personally found the Third Order, but from the beginning of the Order of Preachers, there have always been lay people who associated themselves with the Friars. There are two types of Third Order organizations:
Secular - More commonly called "Lay Dominicans". secular Dominicans began in the thirteenth century as lay people wished to adopt Dominican spirituality. They were given a rule in 1285.
Regular - Congregations of Dominican sisters formed in the nineteenth century. This development can be traced to both the Dominican nuns and secular women tertiaries. Part of the impetus came from bishops in mission territories requesting nuns to assist with opening orphanages, schools, and hospitals. Far from the motherhouse, many of these communities, no longer fully enclosed, separated to form separate congregations. A second reason for the establishment of Dominican congregations was the desire of secular tertiaries to combine living in community with an active apostolate. Dominican sisters are not enclosed. They take simple vows, live in convents, and are engaged in many different apostolates.
 Priestly Fraternities - Prior to Vatican II, the Dominican third Order secular included both lay persons and clergy. A separate fraternity, with its own constitution and rule, was then established for diocesan priests. Members remain under the jurisdiction of their bishops, but are also part of a chapter attached to a nearby Dominican convent of friars.

History 

In the eleventh century there were secular associations, called Penitential Orders, connected with some Benedictine congregations, and later with the Premonstratensians, as well. As the Dominican friars established monasteries and priories, there were lay people who assisted them. Many were attracted to the Dominican's way of life, but for various reasons could not themselves join the order. They formed fraternities or religious guilds affiliated with the local priory. This was a way those who sought a more dedicated way of life embraced a lifestyle similar to that of the Dominicans while retaining their status as a lay person. At first vaguely constituted and living without system or form, its members gradually grew more and more dependent on their spiritual guides. In 1285 Munio of Zamora, the seventh Master General of the Friars Preachers, formulated a definite Rule for these lay penitents. It was based in part on the rule Francis of Assisi gave the Brothers and Sisters of Penance around 1221.

Members who chose to follow this rule would be under the direction of a local Dominican priest. They were called the "Brothers and Sisters of Penance of the Blessed Dominic". Pope Honorius IV granted this new fraternity official Church recognition in January 1286.

A military order, called the Militia Jesu Christi, was founded in Languedoc around 1221. Also supervised by the Dominicans, they were merged with the "Brothers and Sisters of Penance of the Blessed Dominic"
at the close of the 13th century. This amalgamation is admitted by the Bollandists to have become general in the 14th century. The confraternity was commonly referred to as the Order of Penance and were not specifically called a third order until after papal recognition in 1405.

Many held that the condemnation passed on the Beguines and Beghards at the Council of Vienna in 1312 applied no less to the Orders of Penance. In consequence the master-general petitioned Pope John XXII in 1326 to clarify the matter. As a result, he answered by a bull of 1 June 1326 (Cum de Mulieribus), which is a long eulogium on the work of the Dominican Third Order. After the plague of 1348, a good deal of laxity and disorganization crept into the Third Order, but there were also a number of saints such as Catherine of Siena whose influence strengthened it.

Spirit 
Because they belonged to the Third Order, members were often called Tertiaries. Now, the most common term is "Lay Dominicans".

The initial purpose behind the Lay Fraternities of St. Dominic was the preaching of penance; but under Dominican influences it leaned to the intellectual aspect of the faith and based its message on the exposition of the creed. This focus on penance remains a central part of the Dominican charism. "In complementarity with brothers, sisters and nuns they share the charism of St. Dominic through study, prayer, preaching and fraternal life." These are known as "The Four Pillars of the Order", and give shape to Lay Dominican spirituality.

Types
The Third Order as it exists today can be divided into two categories: regular, i.e. comprising Tertiaries who live in community according to a common rule and wear the habit; and secular, i.e. whether married or single, lay people, who live their lives like others of their profession, but who strive, as far as individual circumstances permit, to live a more religious life. l0

Secular
Just as the friars and nun, lay Dominicans follow the Rule of St. Augustine, plus the Rule of the Lay Fraternities of Saint Dominic. The obligations of the Laity are:

1) Daily praying of Lauds and Vespers
2) Daily 5 decades of the rosary
3) Daily Our Father, Hail Mary, and Eternal Rest for all Dominicans
4) Daily 15 minutes of mental prayer or Lectio Divina (prayerful reading of the Sacred Scriptures)
5) Daily Mass and communion is recommended
6) Confession at least monthly
7) Attendance at the monthly Chapter meeting
8) Yearly participation at 3 Masses for Dominicans
9) Fasting on the vigils of St. Dominic, St. Catherine of Siena, and Our Lady of the Rosary if possible.

There are five provinces of Lay Dominicans in North America: one in Canada, and four in the United States.

Regular (Conventual)

In 1842 Margaret Hallahan founded the Dominican Congregation of St. Catherine of Siena in Coventry, England.

In 1850, Boniface Wimmer, a Benedictine from Saint Vincent Abbey in Latrobe, Pennsylvania visited the Monastery of the Holy Cross in Ratisbon, Bavaria and persuaded the prioress to send some nuns to minister to German immigrants in America. In 1853, they founded the Congregation of the Holy Cross in Brooklyn, New York. From this, seven additional congregations sprang serving in thirty-five dioceses.

Also in the United States, in 1995, the three congregations of Dominican sisters merged to form the Dominican Sisters of Hope.

In 2009, the congregation of the Dominican Sisters of Peace was formed with the union of seven previously separate Dominican communities. This included the Congregation of St. Catherine of Siena, founded in Springfield, Kentucky in 1822; the first of the third order foundations of women of the Dominican order in the United States. Also included were the Dominican Sisters of St. Mary of the Springs, founded in 1830 in Columbus, Ohio as a daughter house of the Kentucky community. An eighth congregation joined in 2012.

The Dominican Sisters International Confederation has a membership of 19,407 sisters representing 147 congregations in 109 countries.

Saints and Blesseds
 Zdislava Berka (↑ 1252)
 Alberto da Bergamo (↑ 1279)
 Giovanna da Orvieto (↑ 1306)
 Margaret of Castello (↑ 1320)
 Catherine of Siena (↑ 1380)
 Adrian Fortescue (↑ 1539)
 Rose of Lima (↑ 1617)
 Dominic An-Kham Viet Pham (↑ 1838?)
 Pauline-Marie Jaricot (↑ 1862)
 Pier Giorgio Frassati (↑ 1925)
 Bartolo Longo (↑ 1926)
 Louis-Marie Grignion de Montfort (↑ 1716)

See also 
 Dominican Order

References

Citations

Sources